Canopy Mental Health & Consulting is a Richfield, Minnesota-based company in mental health services. The company is working with the police department of the city of Minneapolis, Minnesota, on a behavioral health pilot program. This program will dispatch unarmed mental health professionals to 911 calls.

The organization has responded to more than 3,300 911 calls as of September 2022. Mayor Jacob Frey proposed an expansion of the program for the 2023–2024 city budget. The 2021–2022 contract is for $6 million over 2 years.

Minneapolis Crisis Response 
The city of Minneapolis routes emergency mental health 911 calls to the Behavioral Crisis Response team (BCR). The city, on average, receives 114 calls per week (from December 2021 to June 2022). As of April 2022, operations were 24 hours a day on weekdays, and 9am–4pm on Saturday and Sunday. Mental health crisis calls must not involve a weapon, no physical violence, no medical emergency, and drugs/alcohol are not escalating the situation. The program involved training 911 responders in mental health.

The city also maintains a separate non-emergency response call line, "311". This call line can handle issues such as parking and traffic issues, as well as theft and property damage. Theft and property damage calls are still reported to the police. Parking and traffic issues route through traffic control. The 311 number also only operates from 7 am to 7 pm. From April through June 2022, 1,600 calls were routed through the 311 number.

See also 
 CAHOOTS (crisis response)
 Police crisis intervention team

References

External links 

 Official website

Minneapolis
Mental health organizations in the United States
Law enforcement non-governmental organizations in the United States
Criminal justice reform in the United States